Vadym Zayats (born 1 June 1974) is a former Ukrainian professional football midfielder who played for different Ukrainian clubs in Ukrainian Premier League.

Until 31 August 2013 he was a manager in FC Bukovyna Chernivtsi in Ukrainian First League.

External links
 Profile at FFU Official Site (Ukr)

1974 births
Living people
Ukrainian footballers
Ukrainian football managers
FC Bukovyna Chernivtsi players
FC Metalurh Zaporizhzhia players
FC Zirka Kropyvnytskyi players
SC Tavriya Simferopol players
FC Hoverla Uzhhorod players
FC Bukovyna Chernivtsi managers
FC Luzhany players
Association football midfielders
Sportspeople from Chernivtsi